Albany Herald of Arms is a Scottish herald of arms of the Court of the Lord Lyon.

The office was first mentioned in a diplomatic mission from Scotland to England in 1401. The office was probably instituted on the creation of Robert Stewart, son of King Robert II, as Duke of Albany, on 28 April 1398.  Albany is an old name for the part of Scotland north of the River Forth, and is cognate with "Alba", the Scottish Gaelic for Scotland.

The badge of office is A saltire Argent enfiled of a coronet of four fleurs-de-lys (one and two halves visible) Or ensigned of the Crown of Scotland Proper.

The office is currently held by Sir Crispin Agnew of Lochnaw.

Holders of the office

See also
Officer of Arms
Herald
Court of the Lord Lyon
Heraldry Society of Scotland

References

External links
The Court of the Lord Lyon



Court of the Lord Lyon
Offices of arms